The seventh and final season of the American political drama television series The West Wing aired in the United States on NBC from September 25, 2005, to May 14, 2006, and consisted of 22 episodes. The series changed time slots from Wednesdays at 9:00 pm to Sundays at 8:00 pm, and the series struggled in its new time slot against ABC's Extreme Makeover: Home Edition and CBS's Cold Case.

The season was released on DVD as a six-disc boxed set under the title The West Wing: The Complete Seventh Season by Warner Home Video being released first in Region 2 on September 11, 2006, and then in Region 1 on November 7, 2006. All episodes from the season are available to purchase and download to registered users of iTunes Stores in certain countries and in the US through Amazon Video on Demand. In Canada, the seventh season was due to be simulcast on CTV; however, CTV dropped the series. In the United Kingdom the season premiered on March 10, 2006, on More4.

Plot 
The seventh and final season principally follows Santos and Vinick on the campaign trail, while also addressing the aftermath of the shuttle leak investigation. The Bartlet administration's last year in office is featured, but not prominently. Toby admits to leaking the story about a military spacecraft and President Bartlet is forced to fire him. Later, Toby refuses to name his recently deceased brother as the source of the classified information, despite being urged to by his ex-wife, his lawyer and a federal prosecutor, as he feels it would be wrong to dishonor his brother's memory. C.J.'s tenure as Chief of Staff becomes more stressful as she deals with the war between Russia and China over Kazakhstan. The presidential race tightens up when Vinick's lead is dampened by an accident at a nuclear plant he had championed. Leo suffers a heart attack and dies on the night of the election, reflecting the death of actor John Spencer.  Santos wins the election, and the last few episodes show the final days of the Bartlet administration and Santos' transition. In the series finale, Santos is sworn in as president.

Cast 
The seventh season had star billing for thirteen major roles, with twelve of these filled by returning main cast members from the sixth season. Jimmy Smits is the only actor to appear in all 22 episodes. Sheen (12 episodes), Alda (12 episodes), Janney (17 episodes), Whitford (19 episodes), McCormack (12 episodes), Chenoweth (10 episodes), and Spencer (7 episodes) are credited for all 22 episodes, despite appearing in a diminished capacity. Spencer died of a heart-attack in December 2005. Hill (5 episodes), Channing (4 episodes), Schiff (11 episodes), Malina (13 episodes), and Moloney (13 episodes) are only credited for the episodes in which they appear.

Main cast 
 Alan Alda as Arnold Vinick
 Stockard Channing as Abbey Bartlet
 Kristin Chenoweth as Annabeth Schott
 Dulé Hill as Charlie Young
 Allison Janney as C. J. Cregg
 Joshua Malina as Will Bailey
 Mary McCormack as Kate Harper
 Janel Moloney as Donna Moss
 Richard Schiff as Toby Ziegler
 John Spencer as Leo McGarry
 Bradley Whitford as Josh Lyman
 Jimmy Smits as Matt Santos
 Martin Sheen as Josiah Bartlet

Recurring cast 
Janeane Garofalo initially joined the show for a three-episode arc as Louise Thornton, a media strategist hired by Matt Santos; however, she became a long-term recurring cast member. Other characters that returned in recurring roles were Ron Silver as Bruno Gianelli, campaign manager for Sen. Vinick. Other guest stars returning to recurring roles include Teri Polo as Helen Santos, Patricia Richardson as Sen. Vinick's chief of staff Sheila Brooks, Lily Tomlin as presidential secretary Debbie Fiderer, Karis Campbell as Santos' secretary Ronna, Allison Smith as Leo's daughter, Mallory, Kathleen York as Andrea Wyatt, Melissa Fitzgerald as Carol, Renée Estevez as Nancy, and Peter James Smith and William Duffy as Ed and Larry and all White House staff. Oliver Platt returned in his recurring role as Oliver Babish, having previously appeared back in 2001. In March 2006, it was announced that a number of former cast members would be reprising the roles of previous characters. These included Rob Lowe as political official Sam Seaborn, Mary-Louise Parker as women's rights advocate  Amy Gardner, Anna Deavere Smith as National Security Advisor Nancy McNally, Emily Procter as Republican attorney Ainsley Hayes, Marlee Matlin as pollster Joey Lucas, Gary Cole as Vice President Bob Russell, Tim Matheson as former Vice President John Hoynes, Timothy Busfield as journalist Danny Concannon, and Annabeth Gish as Liz Bartlet Westin, eldest daughter of President Bartlet.

Episodes

Reception

Critical response
On Rotten Tomatoes, the season has an approval rating of 92% with an average score of 8.5 out of 10 based on 12 reviews. The website's critical consensus reads, "A contentious race for the White House gives The West Wing narrative focus during a final season that bids a heartfelt farewell to President Bartlet while thoughtfully exploring the dynamics of campaigns."

PopMatters said the final season "recovered its sense of humor". David Hinckley of the Daily News praised the character of Bruno Gianelli as a "brilliant (...) shark of a campaign manager" and commended the series for never rushing the romantic character arc of Josh and Donna. As the fictional Election Day approached, Aleksandra Stankovic of The Harvard Crimson said that "a more complex, more mature West Wing, but one with no clear narrative resolution in sight" was evolving and that she welcomed the "restoration of narrative tension". Bill Brioux from the Toronto Sun agreed, stating that the seventh series was "enjoying a creative renaissance" and had been "enlivened by the election storyline". Mike Duffy of the Detroit Free Press said that The West Wing had "rediscovered the vivid political zing in its farewell season"; however, Jeffrey Robinson from DVD Talk commented that the shift away from daily issues and operations in the White House meant "season seven did not feel like The West Wing".

One episode, "The Debate", was aired as live television. Rob Owen of the Pittsburgh Post-Gazette wrote that "real-life issues were brought to a prime-time national audience," but the first half was "boring back-and-forth [with] not much revealed about the characters" and had it not been live it could have been "stronger, better produced and with a less dull first half." Janet Daley of The Daily Telegraph called the episode "riveting, and astonishingly brave" with "dazzling exposition of the central political argument of our time: whether free markets deliver better life chances, and a more virtuous society, than economies controlled by government."

Accolades
The season was nominated for six Primetime Emmy Awards in 2006, winning two. The show was nominated for Outstanding Drama Series for the seventh year running. Alan Alda, as Senator Vinick, won in the award for Outstanding Supporting Actor in a Drama Series. Martin Sheen, as President Bartlet, was nominated for Outstanding Lead Actor in a Drama Series and Allison Janney, as C.J., was nominated in the Outstanding Lead Actress in a Drama Series category. Mimi Leder was nominated for Outstanding Directing in a Drama Series for the episode "Election Day" and Audio mixer Edward J. Greene and EFX mixer Andrew Strauber won the award for Outstanding Multi-camera Sound Mixing for a Series or Special for "The Debate". Eli Attie and John Wells received a Writers Guild of America Award nomination in the Episodic Drama category for "Election Day Part II". Attie and Wells were nominated for the $15,000 Humanitas Prize in the 60-minute category for the same episode, which was also the submission that won the show an AFI Award that year. The show won the Hallmark Hall of Fame Heritage Award at the Television Critics Association Awards and Alda received a nomination for Individual Achievement in Drama. Alda was also nominated for a Screen Actors Guild Award for Outstanding Performance by a Male Actor in a Drama Series, The Guild nominated the whole ensemble for the Outstanding Performance in a Drama Series award. Supervising sound editors Walter Newman and Thomas A. Harris, supervising dialogue editor Catherine Flynn, and dialogue and ADR editors Virginia Cook and Steffan Falesitch were nominated for a Golden Reel Award in the Best Sound Editing in Television: Short Form – Dialogue and Automated Dialogue Replacement with the episode "The Ticket". At the ALMA Awards, a Latino awards ceremony, the show won Best TV Series and Jimmy Smits (as Matt Santos) as Best Actor in a TV Series. At another Latino ceremony, the Imagen Awards, the show won Best Primetime Series with Smits nominated for Best Actor in Television.

Ratings
Despite slipping ratings and a fear the show would be axed, NBC announced in March 2005 that The West Wing would be returning for a seventh season. The change from Wednesdays to Sundays cost the show approximately 30 percent of its audience; the first two episodes of the season garnered the series' lowest ever ratings and Deseret News said the move of time slot sealed the show's fate. In January 2006, it was announced that the seventh would be the final season. Kevin Reilly, entertainment president for NBC, said that after poor viewing figures for the "last couple of seasons [they reached] a point where you look at the ratings and you just say, 'it's time.'"

Crew
The season was produced by John Wells Productions in association with Warner Bros. Television. The executive producers were the production company's namesake and founder John Wells, Christopher Misiano, Alex Graves, political analyst Lawrence O'Donnell and Peter Noah; Noah was previously a supervising producer in the sixth season, and O'Donnell, who is a former Democratic chief of staff on the Senate Committee on Finance, provided insight into political life. The West Wing was created by Aaron Sorkin. For the seventh season, regular staff writers were Wells, O'Donnell, Noah, Eli Attie, Debora Cahn, Josh Singer and Lauren Schmidt, while cast member Bradley Whitford wrote his second episode of the series. The regular directors were Misiano, Graves, Andrew Bernstein and Lesli Linka Glatter.

DVD release
DVDs for season seven were released first in the UK on September 11, 2006, and then in the US on November 7, 2006. As well as every episode from the season, the DVD release features bonus material, including two featurettes on "The Debate". Two versions of "The Debate" were performed, one for the East Coast and another for the West Coast. The West Coast version of "The Debate" is the one used on the DVD.

References

General references

External links
 

 
2005 American television seasons
2006 American television seasons